The 1985 Winfield State League was the inaugural season of the Queensland Rugby League's statewide competition. The competition was run similarly to the NSWRL's Amco Cup, featuring a short format prior the larger Brisbane Premiership season. The Wynnum Manly Seagulls defeated the Brisbane Brothers in the final at Lang Park in Brisbane.

Teams 
A total of 14 teams competed in the inaugural season, 8 of which were BRL Premiership clubs. The remaining six were regional teams from across the state, hence the State League name.

Ladder 
Wynnum-Manly, Souths, Brothers, Easts made the finals from a six round season. Similar to the 1982 and 1983 seasons, all clubs who qualified for the finals were BRL Premiership clubs.

Source:

Finals 
The finals were straight final four series held at QRL headquarters at Lang Park, with Wynnum-Manly and the Brisbane Brothers winning their respective semi finals. In the final, the Seagulls completed a 16-0 shutout of the Brothers to win their second consecutive Winfield State League title.

References

Rugby league in Brisbane
Winfield State League season